Adriatic was launched in 1811 in the United States. The British Royal Navy seized her in July 1812. She was sold in 1813 and her new owners named her Vittoria. She traded with the West Indies, the Mediterranean, and the Indian Ocean, the last sailing under a licence from the British East India Company. She was last listed in 1834.

Adriatic
On 12 July 1812, shortly after the outbreak of war with the United States,  detained the American ships Adriatic, and Triton.

Vittoria
The Prize Court condemned Adriatic. On 16 June 1813 Southam & Co. purchased her and renamed her.

Vittorio first appeared in Lloyd's Register (LR) in 1813. In 1813 the EIC had lost its monopoly on the trade between India and Britain. British ships were then free to sail to India or the Indian Ocean under a licence from the EIC. 

Vittoria, Southam, master, sailed from Portsmouth for the "South Seas" on 23 August 1813. In August 1813, prior to sailing for Île de France (Mauritius), Southam purchased a quantity of "Preserved Meats, Soups, and Milk". He used a little on the outbound leg, but more on the return leg. His letter to the manufacturers, dated 15 January 1815 in London, endorsed the products for their ability to retain the original flavours.

Vittoria next appeared in Lloyd's Lists ship arrival and departure data as returning from Philadelphia on 3 April 1815. On 17 July 1816 Vittoria arrived at New York from Jamaica.

On 23 August 1823, Vittoria, Southam, master, sailed for Bengal under a licence from the EIC.

In May 1825 Vittoria, J.H.Southam, master, had to put back into Calcutta to be docked. She had been on her way from Bengal to Rangoon when she had grounded in the Hooghly. By 23 June she was at Penang.

On 3 June 1827, Vittoria, Southam, master, sailed for Batavia and Singapore.

In 1830 and 1831 Vittoria, Southam, master, traded with Sydney, Hobart, Port Phillip, and New Zealand.

Notes, citations, and references
Notes

Citations

References

1811 ships
Captured ships
Age of Sail merchant ships
Merchant ships of the United Kingdom